Jaime Chavez (born July 17, 1987 in Industry, California, United States) is an American professional soccer player.

Career

Youth and amateur
Chavez attended William Workman High School, and had a successful youth club career playing on winning teams in the Disney Cup, State Cup and Verizon Cup, among others. He played on Chivas USA's U-17 youth team in 2004 and 2005, and went on to play for various amateur teams in the Los Angeles area before signing for the Hollywood United Hitmen in the USL Premier Development League in 2009.

He was Hollywood's leading goal scorer in both his seasons with the team, leading them to the PDL playoffs in consecutive years, scoring 10 goals in 15 games in 2009, and hitting 11 more in 2010. He was named to the PDL All-Western Conference team following the 2010 season.

Professional
Chavez signed with the expansion Los Angeles Blues of the new USL Professional League on January 19, 2011.

Chavez returned to the PDL in 2012 when he signed to play with the Los Angeles Misioneros; he made his debut for his new team on April 29, assisting on Victor Sanchez's goal in a 3-1 loss to Fresno Fuego.

Chavez signed with Oklahoma City Energy FC of USL Championship on December 19, 2019.

References

1987 births
Living people
American soccer players
Association football forwards
Atlanta Silverbacks players
Cal FC players
Fresno FC players
Hollywood United Hitmen players
LA Laguna FC players
Miami FC players
National Premier Soccer League players
North American Soccer League players
OKC Energy FC players
Orange County SC players
Tampa Bay Rowdies players
Soccer players from California
Sportspeople from Los Angeles County, California
USL League Two players
USL Championship players